Richard Tucker (June 4, 1884 – December 5, 1942) was an American actor. Tucker was born in Brooklyn, New York. Appearing in more than 260 films between 1911 and 1940, he was the first official member of the Screen Actors Guild (SAG) and a founding member of SAG's Board of Directors. Tucker died in Woodland Hills, Los Angeles from a heart attack. He is interred at Forest Lawn Memorial Park, in an unmarked niche in Great Mausoleum, Columbarium of Faith.

Selected filmography

 Who Will Marry Mary? (1913) - Duke Leonardo de Ferrara
 Vanity Fair (1915) - George Osborne
 The Ring of the Borgias (1915) - Donald Rivers
 When Love Is King (1916) - Felix, the King
 The Cossack Whip (1916) - Sergius Kordkin
 The Master Passion (1917) - Professor Alberto Martino
 Threads of Fate (1917) - Dr. Grant Hunter
 Pardners (1917) - Justus Morrow
 The Royal Pauper (1917) - William, The Prince Charming, at 21
 The Cloud (1917) - John Saunders
 The Law of the North (1917) - The Rt. Hon. Reginald Annesley
The Power of Decision (1917) - Austin Bland
 The On-the-Square Girl (1917) - Actor
 The Little Chevalier (1917) - Delaup
 Think It Over (1917) - Henry Whitworth
 Babbling Tongues (1917) - Viscount de Bellerive
 Behind the Mask (1917) - Lord Strathmore
 The Woman in Room 13 (1920) - Joe
 Dollars and Sense (1920) - George Garrison
 Darling Mine (1920) - Jay Savoy
 The Great Lover (1920) - Ward
 The Branding Iron (1920) - Prosper Gael
 Roads of Destiny (1921) - Lewis Marsh
 A Voice in the Dark (1921) - Lieutenant Patrick Cloyd
 The Old Nest (1921) - Tom at 36
 Don't Neglect Your Wife (1921) - George Geary
 What Love Will Do (1921) - Herbert Dawson
 Everything for Sale (1921) - Lee Morton
 Voices of the City (1921) - Clancy
 A Virginia Courtship (1921) - Dwight Neville
 Grand Larceny (1922) - Franklin
 The Worldly Madonna (1922) - Alan Graves
 Yellow Men and Gold (1922) - Lynch
 Strange Idols (1922) - Malcolm Sinclair
 When the Devil Drives (1922) - John Graham
 A Self-Made Man (1922) - Hugo Bonsall
 Rags to Riches (1922) - Blackwell Clarke
 Remembrance (1922) - J.P. Grout Jr.
 Hearts Aflame (1923) - Philip Rowe
 The Dangerous Age (1923) - Robert Chanslor
 Poor Men's Wives (1923) - Richard Smith-Blanton
 Is Divorce a Failure? (1923) - David Lockwood
 Lovebound (1923) - Paul Meredith
 Her Accidental Husband (1923) - Paul Dupré
 The Eleventh Hour (1923) - Herbert Glenville
 Cameo Kirby (1923) - Cousin Aaron Randall
 The Broken Wing (1923) - Sylvester Cross
 Beau Brummel (1924) - Lord Stanhope
 40-Horse Hawkins (1924) - Rudolph Catalina
 Helen's Babies (1924) - Tom Lawrence
 The Fast Worker (1924) - Roxbury Medcroft
 The Tornado (1924) - Ross Travers
 The Star Dust Trail (1924) - John Benton
 The Bridge of Sighs (1925) - Glenn Hayden
 The Man Without a Country (1925) - Aaron Burr
 The Air Mail (1925) - Jim Cronin
 The Lure of the Wild (1925) - Gordon Daniels
 The Golden Cocoon (1925) - Mr. Renfro
 The Blind Goddess (1926) - Henry Kelling
 That's My Baby (1926) - Schuyler Van Loon
 Devil's Island (1926) - Jean Valyon
 Shameful Behavior? (1926) - Jack Lee
 The Lily (1926) - Huzar
 A Kiss in a Taxi (1927) - Henri Le Sage
 Matinee Ladies (1927) - Tom Mannion
 The World at Her Feet (1927) - Dr. H.G. Pauls
 Wings (1927) - Air Commander
 Dearie (1927) - Luigi
 The Bush Leaguer (1927) - Wallace Ramsey
 The Desired Woman (1927) - Sir Sydney Vincent
 Sumuru (1927) - Antonio Santos
 Women's Wares (1927) - Frank Stanton
 The Jazz Singer (1927) - Harry Lee
 Beware of Married Men (1928) - Leonard Gilbert
 Thanks for the Buggy Ride (1928) - Mr. McBride
 The Crimson City (1928) - Richard Brand
 A Bit of Heaven (1928) - Mark Storm
 The Grain of Dust (1928) - George
 Loves of an Actress (1928) - Baron Hartman
 Show Girl (1928) - Jack Milton
 Captain Swagger (1928) - Phil Poole
 Show Folks (1928) - Vaudeville Performer
 On Trial (1928) - Prosecuting Attorney
 Love Over Night (1928) - Richard TThorne
 My Man (1928) - Waldo
 The Border Patrol (1928) - Earl Hanway
 Lucky Boy (1928) - Mr. Ellis
 Daughters of Desire (1929)
 The Dummy (1929) - Blackie Baker
 The Squall (1929) - Josef
 This Is Heaven (1929) - E.D. Wallace
 The King of the Kongo (1929) - Chief of the Secret Service
 The Unholy Night (1929) - Col. Davidson
 Half Marriage (1929) - Mr. Page
 Painted Faces (1929) - District Attorney
 Navy Blues (1929) - Man Dancing with Alice (uncredited)
 Peacock Alley (1930) - Martin Saunders
 Puttin' On the Ritz (1930) - Fenway Brooks
 The Lone Defender (1930, Serial) - Introductory Host / Narrator (uncredited)
 The Benson Murder Case (1930) - Anthony Benson
 Courage (1930) - James Rudlin
 Safety in Numbers (1930) - F. Carstair Reynolds
 Shadow of the Law (1930) - Lew Durkin
 Recaptured Love (1930) - Rawlings
 Manslaughter (1930) - J.P. Albee, Attorney
 College Lovers (1930) - Gene Hutton
 Brothers (1930) - Prosecuting Attorney
 The Bat Whispers (1930) - Mr. Bell
 Madonna of the Streets (1930) - Kingsley
 Inspiration (1931) - Galand, the Writer
 Stepping Out (1931) - Charley Miller
 The Spy (1931) - Minor Role
 Hell Bound (1931) - Gilbert
 Too Young to Marry (1931) - Chester Armstrong
 Seed (1931) - Bliss
 Up for Murder (1931) - Cyril Herk
 The Black Camel (1931) - Wilkie Ballou (uncredited)
 A Holy Terror (1931) - Tom Hedges
 Graft (1931) - District Attorney Martin Harrison
 Convicted (1931) - Tony Blair
 The Deceiver (1931) - Mr. Lawton
 X Marks the Spot (1931) - Prosecutor Walter
 The Devil Plays (1931) - Gerald Murdock
 Maker of Men (1931) - Mr. Rhodes
 The Shadow of the Eagle (1932, Serial) - Maj. Evans
 Careless Lady (1932) - Captain Gerard
 Symphony of Six Million (1932) - Guest at Redemption Ceremony (uncredited)
 Flames (1932) - Garson
 Week-End Marriage (1932) - Mr. Jameson (uncredited)
 The Stoker (1932) - Alan Ballard
 Guilty as Hell (1932) - District Attorney
 Pack Up Your Troubles (1932) - Mr. Smith
 A Successful Calamity (1932) - Lawrence, Partington's Partner
 Hat Check Girl (1932) - Mr. Reynolds (uncredited)
 The Crash (1932) - Frank Parrish (uncredited)
 The Iron Master (1933) - Paul Rankin
 Men Must Fight (1933) - Doctor (uncredited)
 Daring Daughters (1933) - Lawton
 The World Gone Mad (1933) - Graham Gaines
 The Working Man (1933) - Reeves Co. Board Member (uncredited)
 Made on Broadway (1933) - Party Guest (uncredited)
Her Resale Value (1933)
 Midnight Mary (1933) - Club Imperial Manager (uncredited)
 Saturday's Millions (1933) - Mr. Chandler
 Meet the Baron (1933) - Radio Station Boss (uncredited)
 Day of Reckoning (1933) - Party Guest (uncredited)
 Only Yesterday (1933) - One of Jim's Friends (uncredited)
 College Coach (1933) - Regent (uncredited)
 Goodbye Love (1933) - Eddie the Lawyer
 The Women in His Life (1933) - Prosecutor (uncredited)
 Public Stenographer (1934) - James Martin Sr.
 This Side of Heaven (1934) - Henry W. Maxwell - Producer (uncredited)
 The Show-Off (1934) - Mr. Edwards (uncredited)
 The Countess of Monte Cristo (1934) - Joe - Picture Director
 The Road to Ruin (1934) - Mr. Dixon
 Looking for Trouble (1934) - Fuller (uncredited)
 A Modern Hero (1934) - Mr. Eggelson
 Sadie McKee (1934) - Dr. Patrick - with Dr. Briggs (uncredited)
 Wild Gold (1934) - Cafe Manager (uncredited)
 Operator 13 (1934) - Execution Officer (uncredited)
 Money Means Nothing (1934) - George Whitney
 Back Page (1934) - John H. Smith
 Baby, Take a Bow (1934) - Mr. Carson
 Paris Interlude (1934) - Stevens
 Handy Andy (1934) - Mr. Beauregard
 The Girl from Missouri (1934) - Paige's Office Manager (uncredited)
 Take the Stand (1934) - Mr. Burnside
 A Successful Failure (1934) - J.W. Blair, Atlas Broadcasting
 Elinor Norton (1934) - Civilian Doctor (uncredited)
 Evelyn Prentice (1934) - Mr. Dillingham - Party Guest (uncredited)
 Sing Sing Nights (1934) - Attorney General
 Biography of a Bachelor Girl (1935) - Mr. Neff (uncredited)
 Buried Loot (1935, Short) - Bank President (uncredited)
 Symphony of Living (1935) - Michael Rupert
 Society Doctor (1935) - McKenzie - Doctor in Gallery (uncredited)
 Shadow of Doubt (1935) - Mark Torrey
 West Point of the Air (1935) - George - Dare's Companion at Football Game (uncredited)
 Mister Dynamite (1935) - Doctor (uncredited)
 $10 Raise (1935) - Mr. Striker (uncredited)
 Murder in the Fleet (1935) - Harry Jeffries
 Calm Yourself (1935) - Police Inspector
 Dante's Inferno (1935) - Mr. Hamilton (uncredited)
 Here Comes the Band (1935) - Jim - Banker in Band
 Diamond Jim (1935) - Headwaiter (uncredited)
 It's in the Air (1935) - Revenue Chief (uncredited)
 Too Tough to Kill (1935) - Mulhern (uncredited)
 Ring Around the Moon (1936) - Baxter
 The Farmer in the Dell (1936) - Lou Wagner (uncredited)
 The Great Ziegfeld (1936) - Barber Shop Customer (uncredited)
 In Paris, A.W.O.L. (1936) - Army Officer
 Flash Gordon (1936, Serial) - Professor Gordon
 Special Agent K-7 (1936) - John Adams - Chief Agent
 In His Steps (1936)
 Libeled Lady (1936) - Barker (uncredited)
 Two Minutes to Play (1936) - Lyman Gaines
 Flying Hostess (1936) - Doctor
 The Plot Thickens (1936) - John Carter
 Headline Crasher (1936) - Sen. James Tallant
 We Who Are About to Die (1937) - Defense Attorney (uncredited)
 She's Dangerous (1937) - District Attorney
 The Woman I Love (1937) - General (uncredited)
 Shall We Dance (1937) - Mr. Russell - Attorney (uncredited)
 Armored Car (1937) - John Hale
 Dangerous Holiday (1937) - Stone (uncredited)
 I Cover the War! (1937) - Army Officer
 Roaring Timber (1937) - Brooks (uncredited)
 Make a Wish (1937) - Grant
 Jungle Menace (1937) - Robert Banning
 Big City (1937) - Dr. Franklin (uncredited)
 Trapped by G-Men (1937) - Agency Chief Conover
 The Girl Said No (1937) - Charles Dillon
 Something to Sing About (1937) - Mr. Blaine
 Rosalie (1937) - Colonel Brandon (uncredited)
 She's Got Everything (1937) - Dr. Blicker (uncredited)
 The Girl of the Golden West (1938) - Colonel (uncredited)
 The Higgins Family (1938) - Burgess
 Test Pilot (1938) - Pilot in Cafe (uncredited)
 Delinquent Parents (1938) - Harry Jefferson
 On the Great White Trail (1938) - Inspector Newcomb
 Letter of Introduction (1938) - Mr. Tucker (uncredited)
 The Texans (1938) - Gen. Corbett (uncredited)
 Sons of the Legion (1938) - State Commander
 Sweethearts (1938) - Man in Lobby (uncredited)
 The Girl Downstairs (1938) - Opera House Manager (uncredited)
 Trade Winds (1938) - John Johnson
 Risky Business (1939) - District Attorney
 They Made Her a Spy (1939) - Colonel at Explosion (uncredited)
 Sudden Money (1939) -  Mr. Rodney Hinds
 Girl from Rio (1939) - Roger Montgomery
 The Covered Trailer (1939) - Doctor
 The Great Victor Herbert (1939) - Michael Brown
 Road to Singapore'' (1940) - Officer on Ship (uncredited)

External links

 
 

1884 births
1942 deaths
American male film actors
American male silent film actors
Male actors from New York City
20th-century American male actors
People from Brooklyn
Burials at Forest Lawn Memorial Park (Glendale)